The Curtiss F11C Goshawk was an American naval biplane fighter aircraft that saw limited success. It was part of a long line of Curtiss Hawk airplanes built by the Curtiss Aeroplane and Motor Company for the American military.

Design and development
In April 1932, when Curtiss was planning the Model 35B, the United States Navy contracted with the manufacturer for an improved derivative of the Model 34C, F6C as the F11C. It contained major changes that included the  Wright R-1510-98 radial engine, single-leg cantilever main landing-gear units, a slight increase in the interplane gap, metal- rather than fabric-covered control surfaces, and armament based on two  fixed forward-firing machine guns supplemented by a hardpoint under the fuselage for the carriage of a  bomb, or an auxiliary fuel tank. Curtiss designed the type as the Model 64 Goshawk, with the U.S. Navy designation XF11C-1 (later XBFC-1 after the adoption of the BF for Bomber-Fighter category). The aircraft was of fabric-covered metal construction, used the wing cell structure of the dismantled YP-23, and was delivered in September 1932.

Shortly before ordering the XF11C-1, the Navy had bought a company-owned Model 64A demonstrator. This had a Wright R-1820-78 Cyclone engine, slightly longer main landing-gear legs carrying wheels with low-pressure tires, a tailwheel in place of the tailskid, fabric-covered control surfaces on the tail, and external provision for underwing racks for light bombs as well as an under-fuselage hardpoint for either a 50 gal (189 L) fuel tank or the crutch that would swing a bomb clear of the propeller disc before release in a dive-bombing attack.

Flight trials of this XF11C-2 (later redesignated as the XBFC-2) revealed the need for a small number of minor changes. After making the changes, the XF11C-2 came to be regarded as the prototype for the F11C-2, of which 28 examples were ordered as dual-role fighter-bombers in October 1932.

From March 1934, the aircraft were revised with a semi-enclosed cockpit and a number of other modifications before they received the revised designation BFC-2 in recognition of their fighter-bomber or, as the Navy would have it, bomber-fighter role The last aircraft in the XF11C-2 contract was converted to the prototype XF11C-3, incorporating a more powerful R-1820-80 engine and a hand-operated retractable landing gear.

Operational history
In March 1934, when the aircraft were redesignated BFC-2, the "High Hat Squadron" was renumbered VB-2B, and then VB-3B, and retained its BFC-2s until February 1938. VB-6 never actually embarked on Enterprise with the BFC bombers.

The F11C-2 Goshawk was produced in two export versions as the Hawk I and Hawk II fighters. Both versions carried the same armament as the production F11C-2. Only the Hawk II was exported in quantity with Turkey, the first customer taking delivery of 19 on August 30, 1932. Colombia placed an order at the end of October 1932, receiving an initial batch of four twin float-equipped Hawk IIs, the first of a total of 26 float fighters delivered by the end of July 1934. The Colombian Air Force used Hawk II and F11C-2 based in floats in the Colombia-Peru War in 1932-1933. Nine Hawk IIs were supplied to Bolivia, of which three had interchangeable wheel/float undercarriages; four were delivered to Chile,  four to Cuba, two to Germany, one to Norway and 12 to Thailand as Hawk IIIs. 

The Chinese Nationalist Air Force received 52 F11Cs as Hawk IIs and fought against the Japanese during the Second Sino-Japanese War. Hawk II squadron commander Captain Chan Kee-Wong of the 28th Squadron, 5th Fighter Group based at Chuyung Airbase for the defense of Nanking at the outbreak of the war against the Imperial Japanese invasion, made a partial claim in the shooting-down of a Mitsubishi G3M medium-heavy bomber on 15 August, 1937. He and half of his squadron were soon dispatched to Taiyuan in the northern front of the war in China, and famously shot down Major Hiroshi Miwa (former military flight instructor for Zhang Xueliang's Fengtian Army air corps), commander of the 16th Hiko Rentai, 1st Daitai squadron of Kawasaki Ki-10 fighters during the Battle of Taiyuan It was the main battlefield of the F11C in World War 2.

Thai Hawk IIIs saw action during World War II, including against the Royal Air Force. On 8 April 1944, a Thai Hawk III was shot down by a No. 211 Squadron RAF Bristol Beaufighter over Lamphun, the pilot of the downed aircraft escaping by parachute.

Variants
XF11C-1 (Model 64)
First prototype derived from the F6C Hawk.
XF11C-2 (Model 64A)
Second prototype, redesignated XBFC-2.
F11C-2 (Model 64A)
Production version, redesignated BFC-2; 28 built.
XF11C-3 (Model 67)
One F11C-2 fitted with retractable undercarriage and a  R-1820-80, later redesignated XBF2C-1 fighter-bomber.
BFC-2 Hawk
Redesignation of F11C-2.

Operators

 Bolivian Air Force

 Chilean Air Force

 Chinese Nationalist Air Force

 Colombian Air Force - Used in the Colombia-Peru War.

 Cuban Air Force

Two aircraft were bought by Germany for evaluation. One of them, D-3165, was tested as a floatplane.

 Royal Norwegian Air Force - One aircraft purchased for evaluation purposes.

 Royal Thai Air Force

 Turkish Air Force

Peruvian Navy - Three float-equipped aircraft were purchased in March 1933. Four additional machines were bought in 1934.

United States Navy operated 28 aircraft as the squadron VF-1B, flying from the aircraft carrier .

Surviving aircraft
During the spring of 1933, Franz Muller who was a senior official in the Reich Air Ministry, informed Göring that he was approached by Udet to seek approval for the purchase of two Goshawks for dive bombing trials. Göring authorized the funds via the German Embassy in Washington DC. In October 1933 the pair of Goshawks arrived in Bremerhaven aboard the liner SS Europa. Udet used one of these Goshawks (designated D-IRIK) in aerobatic exhibitions held during the 1936 Summer Olympics, the aircraft survived the war, was eventually found in a field outside Kraków, now on display in the Polish Aviation Museum.

A BFC-2 is in the National Naval Aviation Museum on NAS Pensacola, Florida.

A Hawk III, the only one existing, has been restored by the Royal Thai Air Force Museum. The aircraft on display is painted with (Hanuman, white body) insignia identifying it as belonging to Wing 4. The Hawk III served in the RTAF between 1934–1949.

Specifications (F11C-2) & (BFC-2)

Notes

Bibliography

Eden, Paul and Soph Moeng. The Complete Encyclopedia of World Aircraft. London: Amber Books, 2002. .
 
Swanborough, Gordon and Peter M. Bowers. United States Military Aircraft Since 1911. Annapolis, Maryland: Naval Institute Press, 1976. .

External links

Bolivian Curtiss Hawk II
Curtiss Goshawk Marketing Brochure
The Curtiss F11C-2 Goshawk Images
Silhouette of the plane

F11C
1930s United States fighter aircraft
Single-engined tractor aircraft
Biplanes
Carrier-based aircraft
Aircraft first flown in 1932
World War II Chinese fighter aircraft